Michał Leszczyłowski (born 30 July 1950) is a Polish-born naturalised Swedish film editor who has worked mostly in the Swedish film industry. He has won several awards, including a Guldbagge Award for Creative Achievement in 1989 and a Jussi Award for Best Editing for his work on Fire-Eater in 1999.

Selected filmography
 Mammoth (2008) editor
 Dalecarlians (2004) editor
 Lilya 4-ever (2002) editor
 Show Me Love (1998) editor
 Private Confessions (1996) editor
 Speak Up! It's So Dark (1993) editor
 Regi Andrej Tarkovskij (Directed by Andrei Tarkovsky) (1988) director
 The Sacrifice (1986) editor

References

External links

1950 births
Living people
Polish film editors
Polish emigrants to Sweden